The Panasonic Lumix DMC-FZ18 is a superzoom bridge digital camera that features:
 8.1 megapixel resolution
 Fast f/2.8 Leica-branded zoom lens with super 18x zoom range
 Mega O.I.S. (optical image stabilizer) in the lens, reducing blurring by compensating for hand shake
 Intelligent ISO Control
 4x Digital Zoom
 Multiple modes of operation, including manual modes
 Optional Raw image format
 VGA movie mode in both normal and wide aspect ratio
 Compact size and light weight
As with most Panasonic Lumix cameras it uses a Venus Engine, in this case the Venus Engine III.

The camera has a 2.5" color LCD display and a color electronic viewfinder, and is available in two colors, black (suffix K) and silver (suffix S).

The DMC-FZ18 became available in the United States in July 2007. The successor to the FZ18 is the FZ28.

The range of digital superzoom cameras also include models like the Nikon Coolpix P90.

External links 
Product info from Panasonic.

Reviews 
http://www.steves-digicams.com/camera-reviews/panasonic/lumix-dmc-fz1/panasonic-lumix-dmc-fz1-review.html
http://www.digitalcamerareview.com/camerareview/panasonic-lumix-dmc-fz18-review/
http://www.dcviews.com/reviews/Panasonic-FZ18/Panasonic-FZ18-review.htm
http://www.photoxels.com/panasonic-fz18-review.html
http://www.trustedreviews.com/Panasonic-Lumix-DMC-FZ18-review
https://web.archive.org/web/20081206173339/http://blog.wired.com/gadgets/2007/08/review-panaso-1.html
http://gadgets.fosfor.se/panasonic-lumix-fz18-review/
http://www.imaging-resource.com/PRODS/FZ18/FZ18A.HTM
http://www.dpreview.com/articles/9332056286/panasonicfz18
https://gizmodo.com/281632/panasonic-intros-18x-optical-zoom-powerhouse-lumix-dmc-fz18
http://digicamreview.com/panasonic_lumix_dmc_fz18_review.htm
http://www.tlc-systems.com/artzen2-0037.htm

Bridge digital cameras
Superzoom cameras
FZ18
Live-preview digital cameras